The Irish Socialist Network (ISN) is a democratic socialist organisation formed in 2001. It is a campaigning organisation which works actively to fight for the rights of Irish workers and to help build a socialist Ireland. It is based in Belfast and Dublin. Politically, the ISN locates itself within the Marxist tradition, but it rejects both Leninism and Trotskyism, partly because of its opposition to democratic centralist organisational structures and to the concept of the vanguard party, which it deems elitist. Most of the founding members were former members of the Workers' Party, some being involved in the Official Republican Movement split in the late 1990s.

The ISN is organised in both the Republic of Ireland and Northern Ireland. In July 2007, it had three branches: Dublin Central, Dublin North-West and Belfast. It produces a bi-monthly, full-colour free paper called Resistance, the first issue of which was published in July/August 2007. The ISN's Dublin North-West branch also produces the Finglas People, a freesheet that is widely distributed in the area. Much of the group's publications and articles are freely available on its website.

Campaigning activity
The ISN has been involved in many community campaigns playing a role in campaigns against a poll tax-like refuse collection charge, commonly known as the 'bin tax', in the Republic of Ireland and a similar water charge in Northern Ireland.

In autumn 2003, members John O'Neill, Colm Breathnach and Bernadette Hughes were sent to Mountjoy Prison for two weeks for refusing to abide by a High Court injunction relating to the blockading of bin lorries. This was part of the Anti-Bin Tax Campaign. People from other groups, and non-aligned activists also went to prison for varying amounts of time for similar reasons.

The ISN has been deeply involved in the movement against the wars in Iraq, Afghanistan, and the occupation of Palestine. It disaffiliated from the Irish Anti-War Movement in 2004, and has since joined Anti-War Ireland – a group committed to anti-imperialism, a diversity of tactics in bringing an end to imperialism, democratic internal structures, non-sectarian behavior, and competence in its activity.

The ISN held its first annual conference in June 2005.

In summer 2003 the Irish Socialist Network organised discussions among various small tendencies on the left about having a united front.

The ISN continues to be active in campaigns against fascism, racism, low pay exploitation and religious sectarianism. The group also advocates environmentalism and supports the rights of workers, women, ethnic minorities and homosexuals. The ISN was also part of a leftist alliance that opposed the Lisbon Treaty in 2008.

In 2010 the ISN participated in the One Per Cent Network along with other socialist groups such as éirígí, Seomra Spraoi and the Workers Solidarity Movement which campaigns against the cut backs brought in by the Irish Government due to the recession.

Electoral Activity
The Irish Socialist Network ran John O'Neill as a candidate in the 2004 local elections (Finglas area). He also stood in the 2007 general election in the Dublin North-West constituency.
O'Neill ran unsuccessfully in the Finglas electoral area in the 2009 local elections.

The Irish Socialist Network announced it would not stand candidates in the 2011 General Election due to fiscal considerations, they did announce that they intend to run candidates in the forthcoming local elections in Ireland North and South.

The Irish Socialist Network is a group of social revolutionaries, who wish to fundamentally overturn capitalism and its political superstructure. It does not see its role as that of radical social reformers, who wish simply to extend democratic rights and fight for social change within the dominant socio-economic formation. Although arguing and fighting for progressive reforms, the ISN does not view these as a maximal objective.

Pamphlets
The ISN also publish a series of pamphlets:

The Ideas of Karl Marx : A Beginner's Guide. Aindrias O'Cathasaigh, Irish Socialist Network, 2003.
Parting Company : Ending Social Partnership. Irish Socialist Network, 2003. 
After the Troubles: Republicanism, Socialism & Partition. Tommy McKearney, Colm Breathnach, Ed Walsh. Irish Socialist Network, 2009.
Neo-Liberalism in Crisis: What Comes Next?. Irish Socialist Network, 2009.
South Africa: the New Apartheid. Ed Walsh. Irish Socialist Network, 2009.
A Force for Progress? 5 Myths about the European Union. Irish Socialist Network, 2009.

References

2001 establishments in Ireland
All-Ireland organisations
Marxist organizations
Organizations established in 2001
Political advocacy groups in Ireland
Socialist organisations in Ireland
Socialist organisations in the United Kingdom